Surviving Sid is a 2008 computer-animated short film from Blue Sky Studios, starring Sid the Sloth of Ice Age and a cameo appearance by Scrat. It is the third in the series of Ice Age short films, the other two being Gone Nutty and No Time for Nuts. Unlike the first two Ice Age short films, Surviving Sid focuses on Sid and a small animal group of camping children. Directed by Galen Tan Chu and Karen Disher, the short premiered on December 9, 2008, on the Horton Hears a Who! DVD and Blu-ray.

Plot 
Two weeks after the events of the second film and before the third film with dinosaurs, Sid, who was hired as a camp counselor by his friends Manny and Diego, takes a school of children out on a camping trip from home, only to find that he is not a very good guide and the children are bored. In a cameo appearance, Scrat has swallowed his acorn and is struggling to keep it down. He coughs it up and it is stolen from him by the S'more. The camping trip leaves some of the children somewhat traumatized. Sid tries to pick a flower, but somehow this has led to a tree falling, which then hits a rock, which causes a chain reaction and hits a series of larger rocks, until eventually hitting a large iceberg. The iceberg then carves out a u-shaped valley, which Sid later names the Grand Canyon. Afterwards the kids get so annoyed with Sid that it ends with them tying him up. 20,000 years later on present day, it shows a father and son beaver looking over the Grand Canyon with the son asking who made it. The father replies "Nature or a being with infinite wisdom."

Cast 
 John Leguizamo as Sid the Sloth
 Chris Wedge as Scrat
 Shane Baumel as Whiny Beaver Boy
 Paul Butcher as Smarty Pants Molehog Boy
 Karen Disher as S'more
 Sean Micheal Cunningham as Glyptodon Boy
 Khamani Griffin as Beaver Son
 John Hawkinson as Beaver Dad
 Feodor Lark as Aardvark Girl Cindy
 Emily Osment as Start Girl Claire

Release 
The short film was released with the Horton Hears a Who! Blu-ray and DVD, which was released on December 9, 2008.

As of July 2009, it is also available as a free "Video Podcast" in the USA iTunes Store, and on the PlayStation Network.

References

External links

 
 

2008 films
2008 short films
Ice Age (franchise) films
Computer-animated short films
20th Century Fox short films
2008 computer-animated films
Blue Sky Studios short films
2000s American animated films
Films directed by Karen Disher
2000s English-language films